Tony Guilfoyle (born 30 March 1960) is an Irish actor. He was born in County Wicklow, Ireland, and was educated at the Drama Centre from 1970 to 1973. He is best known for his recurring role as the accident-prone Father Larry Duff, in the TV comedy series Father Ted.

In theatre, he is best known for his long collaboration with Quebecois theatre director Robert Lepage and the latter's production company Ex Machina. Included in that association are a staging of Mahler's Kindertotenlieder at the Lincoln Center and world tour, The Geometry Of Miracles performed at the Royal National Theatre and worldwide, The Dragons' Trilogy performed at the Barbican Theatre in London and internationally, and their latest collaboration, Playing Cards: SPADES, the first in a planned tetralogy covering the four suits of deck of playing cards, which played at the Roundhouse in London and internationally. He has other numerous and varied theatre credits, from Shopping and F**king at the Royal Court Theatre in the West End, to The Iceman Cometh at the Almeida Theatre in London, with Kevin Spacey, and Hanif Kureshi's play Outskirts with the Royal Shakespeare Company at the Donmar Warehouse in London.

In cinema, Guilfoyle played the lead, Rory, in The Return (1986), for Film Four, and the Magistrate in The Murder of Stephen Lawrence, written and directed by Paul Greengrass. On TV, in addition to playing Father Larry Duff on Father Ted, he starred in the HBO/BBC historical drama Rome, playing Pothinus, an Egyptian eunuch and pharaoh's aide. Other TV credits include a role in a 1985 episode of Juliet Bravo, as unhinged hostage taker Moll Kelly, and brief roles in The Musketeers, Merlin, The Virgin Queen, Fanny Hill, and Bleak House. In 2016, he appeared as the Bishop of Durham, in the Netflix series The Crown. In October 2019, he appeared as Jack Dacre in an episode of the BBC soap opera Doctors.

Filmography

References

External links 

Tony Guilfoyle's CV; represented by Eamonn Bedford Agency

Living people
1960 births
Irish male stage actors
Irish male television actors
Male actors from County Wicklow